Rhode Island Public Radio, doing business as The Public's Radio, is the NPR member radio network for the state of Rhode Island and southeastern Massachusetts.  Its studios are in the historic Union Station in downtown Providence.  The network airs a format of news and talk from NPR, APM, PRX and other sources, such as Morning Edition, On Point, KERA's Think and All Things Considered, as well as extensive local news coverage.

Local programming
In addition to NPR, APM and other public radio programming from national sources, RIPR has dedicated reporters covering specific beats, including Politics, Health Care, Education, the Environment, and Arts & Culture. RIPR also produces local segments including:
 Political Roundtable with Ian Donnis & Maureen Moakley every Friday
 Artscape, a weekly look at the arts & culture scene in Rhode Island.
 One Square Mile, an annual special week-long series, taking an in-depth look at one city or town in Rhode Island. Previous OSM series include: Central Falls, Bristol, Woonsocket, West Warwick, Block Island, Narragansett Bay itself, and Newport

Previously produced series include:
 This I Believe: New England with Frederic Reamer, a local take on the famous This I Believe series of essays
 Mosaic, a weekly deep-dive into the stories from, of and by, immigrants to Rhode Island.
 Made in Rhode Island, an ongoing occasional series looking at manufacturing in the state
 Policy & Pinot, an ongoing occasional series taped live at the Providence Athenaeum Library focusing on various topics

Local news bureaus
In addition to the "main studio" located in 1 Union Station in downtown Providence, TPR also operates three local news bureaus:
 South Coast, located in the UMass Dartmouth CVPA Star Store at the corner of Union and Purchase Streets in downtown New Bedford, covering the South Coast region.
 Newport, located at Washington Square in downtown Newport, covering Aquidneck Island and Jamestown.
South County, located in the United Theatre in Westerly, covering Washington County and Block Island.

Each bureau has a permanently-assigned, full-time bureau reporter, and a fully-soundproofed recording booth for interviews, live broadcasts, and similar projects.

Broadcast stations
The network's primary signal, WNPN (89.3 FM) in Newport, broadcasts from the old WLNE-TV tower in Tiverton and covers most of Rhode Island and the Massachusetts South Coast. It is the tallest active FM broadcast transmitter in Rhode Island (measured in height above sea level). 

Smaller repeater signals provide additional coverage in Providence (W275DA, WPVD), Portsmouth (WNPH) and South County (WNPE).  

From October 2011 until September 2021, RIPR's content was simulcast on WELH (88.1 FM) in Providence, RI.

From April 2011 until April 2021, RIPR's content was simulcast on WCVY (91.5 FM) in Coventry, RI.

The network's programming is also available on Full Channel Digital Cable channel 799 in Bristol, Warren and Barrington.

Technology
WNPN transmits using a Nautel GV15 transmitter with 10,187 watts transmitter power output (TPO) to make 7,000 watts effective radiated power (ERP). A Shivley Labs 6016 four-panel antenna array is used; the antenna is fairly directional, with nulls to avoid prohibited interference to/from WQPH (89.3 FM) Shirley, Massachusetts, to the north-northwest, and to WPKT (89.1 FM) Norwich, Connecticut, to the west-southwest. An Omnia 9 FM/HD processor from The Telos Alliance is used to keep audio levels consistent. The station broadcasts in digital HD Radio, and the BBC World Service is transmitted on the HD2 of WNPN. A 67 kHz subcarrier is transmitted for the Massachusetts Radio Reading Service Audible Local Ledger.

HD Radio
WNPN and WNPE broadcast in HD Radio, simulcasting the analog signal on the HD1 channel. 

WNPN 89.3-HD2 has broadcast the BBC World Service since March 2020.

WNPH, WPVD and W275DA do not broadcast in HD Radio.

From March 2013 until February 2018, MVYradio leased the HD2 multicast channel of WNPE to broadcast a modified content stream of WMVY (88.7 FM) on Martha's Vineyard, which could also be heard on W243AI (96.5 FM), a lower powered FM translator transmitting from the roof of Newport Hospital.  Afterwards, WNPE discontinued the HD2 broadcast, but continued HD Radio operations for its main HD1 channel.

History
In the 1990s, a group of Rhode Islanders formed the Foundation for Ocean State Public Radio in order to bring a local public radio station to the state. Clare Gregorian was described as the "driving force" behind the idea. At the time, Rhode Island was the only state in New England (traditionally one of the bedrocks of support for NPR) and one of only two in the entire country (the other being Delaware) that did not have a full-service NPR station within its borders. Most of the state got at least a grade B signal from Boston's WGBH (with Providence itself receiving a city-grade signal) and WBUR.  After a few years of looking, they found a partner in Boston University, owner of WBUR.  BU agreed to buy WRCP (1290 AM), a 5,000-watt station that had been on the air since 1947, for $1.9 million; the foundation conducted a statewide drive to help raise the funds.  For many years, 1290 AM had been known as WICE, but switched to Portuguese programming as WRCP in 1983.

On May 1, 1998, WRCP's calls officially changed to WRNI, and the license was officially transferred to the WRNI Foundation, a separate fundraising group set up by WBUR to handle local underwriting.

Even though BU doubled WRNI's transmission power to 10,000 watts, its signal was not strong enough to reach the southern and western portion of the state (though it provides a city-grade signal to Newport, southern Rhode Island's biggest city).  Accordingly, in 1999, BU bought WERI (1230 AM) in Westerly, which had been on the air since 1949.  BU changed WERI's calls to WXNI, and made it a full-time satellite of WRNI.  The station brought a city-grade NPR signal to southern Rhode Island for the first time ever.

BU and WBUR had very big plans for WRNI at first. It moved WRNI from its longtime studio on Douglas Avenue to a state-of-the-art facility at Union Station.  It also started a daily two-hour local news magazine, One Union Station.    It also had plans to set up a third station to fill the gaps in WXNI's 1,000-watt signal. However, budget problems brought on by the September 11, 2001 attacks forced One Union Station's cancellation. It was replaced with a one-hour news magazine that was canceled in 2004. At that point, WRNI's local operations were significantly cut back, with most of the station's staff either laid off or transferred to Boston. As a result, WRNI's schedule became almost identical to that of WBUR.

Controversy over sale of 1290 AM
On September 17, 2004, with no advance warning, WBUR Group general manager Jane Christo announced that WRNI and WXNI were being put on the market. She wouldn't give any specifics, only saying that it was time for Rhode Islanders to buy the stations if they wanted to keep NPR programming in the state.  Indeed, WBUR claimed that it never intended to operate WRNI on a long-term basis, and had only intended to help develop it into a self-sustaining service.

The reaction in Rhode Island was hostile. In an editorial, The Providence Journal said that WBUR had made numerous long-term commitments to WRNI. The Journal claimed that if the station's local backers had to buy WRNI, it would be tantamount to buying the station twice.

The announcement led state attorney general Patrick Lynch to open an investigation into WBUR and WRNI.

On September 27, BU interim president Aram Chobanian delayed the sale of WRNI and WXNI, citing concerns raised by both Lynch and Rhode Island Governor Don Carcieri.  Memos obtained by The Boston Globe revealed that WBUR felt the Rhode Island stations were money bleeders, and had decided to either lease or sell the stations at the earliest opportunity.  The furor over the WRNI sale was one factor in Christo's resignation almost a month later.

In June 2005, BU took WRNI and WXNI off the market.  It promised to hire a full-time general manager based in Providence, and also stepped up local news coverage.  As a result, Lynch closed his investigation in November 2006.

Independence from Boston University
On March 21, 2007, WBUR announced that it was selling WRNI to Rhode Island Public Radio (formerly the Foundation for Ocean State Public Radio) for $2 million. Rhode Island Public Radio also announced it was buying WAKX (102.7 FM) in Narragansett Pier from Davidson Media Group to serve as a repeater for WRNI in southern Rhode Island. WAKX, which signed on in 1989, had been a smooth jazz station (though its call letters referred to a former simulcast of WWKX, which lasted from 1997 to 2005).  As part of the sale agreement, BU agreed to provide engineering and programming assistance to RIPR for five years.

RIPR officially took control of WAKX on May 17, 2007; changing the calls to WRNI-FM. The addition of WRNI-FM made WXNI redundant, and BU sold that station separately to Diponti Communications, which renamed it WBLQ.  RIPR took control of WRNI on September 1, 2008.

RIPR registered the domain name ripr.org on February 13, 2007; the site was live as of June 2007.

Migration to FM

Recognizing the long-term challenges of AM broadcasting, and the general expectation by public radio listeners that public radio stations transmit on the noncommercial end of the FM band (88.1-91.9 MHz), in 2011 WRNI began to expand into a statewide network of FM signals.  Accordingly, it also began branding itself exclusively as "Rhode Island Public Radio."

July 2011 (WCVY): RIPR entered an agreement with WCVY (91.5 FM), which is owned and operated by Coventry High School and covers the Kent County region. Previously, because WCVY did not broadcast 24/7, they had been forced, under FCC rule 73.561(b), to "share-time" 16 hours per day of the frequency with the now-defunct religious station WRJI. After WRJI lost its license, RIPR assisted WCVY in "reclaiming" the frequency for 24/7 operation.  With the 2011 agreement, WCVY aired its own student-created programming on weekdays from 2-8p.m. when school is in session, and The Public's Radio filled the remainder of the time to avoid another "share-time" challenge.  The lease agreement ended in April 2021 and WCVY left the network.

October 2011 (WELH): RIPR signed a 10-year lease with The Wheeler School, a K-12 private day school and owner of WELH (88.1 FM). RIPR's content would be heard 24/7 on 88.1 in Providence except for a student-produced sports talk program midnight-3 Saturday mornings.  The remainder of Wheeler's student media was migrated to internet radio and, more recently, to internet video projects. As part of this new lease, the previous lease tenants on 88.1, Brown Student Radio, and Latino Public Radio, each broadcasting a limited number of hours each day, were displaced:

BSR began an internet radio station "BSRlive" and, in January 2015, was granted an FCC license for an LPFM station, WBRU-LP, on 101.1 FM in Providence, in conjunction with Providence Community Radio and AS220.
Latino Public Radio signed a lease with RIPR to broadcast on RIPR's 1290 AM signal, WRNI, and moved to 1290 AM the same day RIPR moved to 88.1 FM.  In addition to allowing LPR to broadcast 24/7, it also gave them a larger signal.

In part because of W275DA coming on the air, RIPR elected not to renew the 10-year lease of WELH upon its expiration.  On September 30, 2021, WELH reverted to Wheeler School-created programming.

July 2017 (WXNI): RIPR announced a deal in January 2017 with the University of Massachusetts, Dartmouth to purchase WUMD (89.3 FM).  The deal included a move and expansion of the existing signal from the UMass Dartmouth campus to a taller tower in Tiverton.  The station's FCC city of license was changed from North Dartmouth, Massachusetts, to Newport, Rhode Island. While not quite a "statewide" signal, the new 89.3 will provide one, single frequency that all the Narragansett Bay and South Coast communities can tune to hear the network.  On June 26, 2017, "WUMD" ended at noon and transitioned to an online-only station; the 89.3 signal went dark for two weeks to add new studio/transmitter link equipment.  89.3 returned to the airwaves at 10 p.m. on July 11, 2017 as "WXNI", simulcasting RIPR programming.

September 2018 (WNPN): Construction quickly began to expand 89.3 by refurbishing the old WLNE tower, and a "license to cover" was applied for with the FCC on August 2, 2018 indicating imminent operation from the new facility. On September 1, 2018, WNPN began transmitting full-time from the Tiverton facility.  The move roughly doubles the coverage of the original facility, adding 700,000 new listeners in Rhode Island and the South Coast.

September 2021 (WNPH): after the Portsmouth Abbey School returned the license for WJHD to the FCC, RIPR asked them to rescind the license deletion and purchased it on November 26, 2021 for $7500 plus technical assistance in their "podcast studio".  The call letters were changed to WNPK and an application filed to move 90.7 off-campus to a tower in South Kingstownnear the University of Rhode Island, greatly expanding the signal. At the moment, the now-WNPH operates at a low power while waiting for the FCC to approve its application to move to a new tower in and greatly expand the signal.

October 2021 (W275DA): at the end of September, repeater station W275DA begins broadcasting on 102.9FM in Providence from high atop the WPRO-FM tower on Neutaconkanut Hill.  Concordantly, the lease on WELH is not renewed.

December 2021 (WPVD): to avoid significant looming infrastructure repair costs and ongoing operating expenses, WPVD 1290AM is modified from 10,000 watts directional (4 towers) to 400 watts day / 16 watts night (1 tower).

Rebranding to The Public's Radio

In October 2018, to reflect its expanded audience, the network rebranded as The Public's Radio. According to CEO Torey Malatia, branding as merely a Rhode Island service was no longer accurate since it now served Massachusetts as well. After seriously considering changing a name change to "Southern New England Public Radio," network officials decided it was best to choose an identity "based on what we do as opposed to our zip code." However, the corporate name remains Rhode Island Public Radio.

Awards
RIPR has won over 30 Associated Press Awards for news coverage, seven Public Radio News Directors Inc Awards, and seven RTDNA Edward R. Murrow Awards.

References

External links

NPR member networks
News and talk radio stations in the United States
Radio stations established in 1998
1998 establishments in Rhode Island